Psilosis (from Greek ψίλωσις, "thinning out") can mean:

 Psilosis, the loss of the sound /h/ in the history of the Greek language
 Psilosis, another name for coeliac disease, also known as sprue
 Psilosis, another name for hair loss
 Sylosis, a British metal band